Tuomas Aho (born 27 May 1981) is a Finnish former professional footballer who played as a centre-back. He made more than 300 appearances in the Veikkausliiga, and had a short stint abroad with Danish Superliga club AGF.

Career

Early years
Aho played youth football for KeuPa, Kumu JT, FC Kouvola and FC Kuusankoski. He made his senior debut for the latter in the 1998 season.

He made his debut in the Veikkausliiga on 27 June 1999 for MyPa in a match against FC Jazz. He won the Finnish Cup with the club in 2004.

AGF
On 23 December 2004, Aho signed with Danish Superliga club AGF after his contract with MyPa had expired. He made his debut on 20 March 2005, coming on as an substitute in stoppage time for Tobias Grahn in a 2–1 home win over Nordsjælland. He played his first full game on 7 May in a 3–1 away loss to AaB.

Return to Finland
Aho returned to Finland on 1 May 2006, signing with HJK. He played for the club through three seasons, before returning to MyPa on 3 December 2008. He served as club captain of both HJK and MyPa.

On 13 March 2015, Aho signed a one-year contract with HIFK, who were newly promoted to the top division.

Personal life
Aho has studied sport pedagogy at the University of Jyväskylä.

Honours
MyPa
 Finnish Cup: 2004

HJK
 Finnish Cup: 2006, 2008

References

External links
 Tuomas Aho at The Guardian
 Tuomas Aho at Veikkausliiga
 

1981 births
Living people
People from Parikkala
Finnish footballers
Finland youth international footballers
Finland under-21 international footballers
Finland international footballers
Finnish expatriate footballers
Association football defenders
Veikkausliiga players
Danish Superliga players
Myllykosken Pallo −47 players
Aarhus Gymnastikforening players
Helsingin Jalkapalloklubi players
Klubi 04 players
HIFK Fotboll players
Expatriate men's footballers in Denmark
Finnish expatriate sportspeople in Denmark
Sportspeople from South Karelia
University of Jyväskylä alumni